75 Squadron or 75th Squadron may refer to:

 No. 75 Squadron RAAF
 No. 75 Squadron RNZAF 
 No. 75 Squadron RAF

United States:
 75th Aero Squadron
 75th Bombardment Squadron
 75th Expeditionary Airlift Squadron
 75th Expeditionary Air Support Operations Squadron
 75th Fighter Squadron
 75th Troop Carrier Squadron